Christina Otzen (born 4 October 1975 in Gentofte, Denmark) is an international sailor. She won a bronze medal in the Yngling class in the 2004 Summer Olympics.

References

1975 births
Living people
Danish female sailors (sport)
Olympic sailors of Denmark
Sailors at the 2004 Summer Olympics – Yngling
Olympic bronze medalists for Denmark
Olympic medalists in sailing
Medalists at the 2004 Summer Olympics